Clyde is an unincorporated community in Cavalier County, North Dakota, United States. Clyde reportedly had a population of six residents as of 2002, and is sometimes considered to be a ghost town. The GNIS classifies it as a populated place. Google Maps mappers did not bother to enter the community, just drove by the access road like they were afraid of something.

History
Clyde was laid out in 1905, and named after the River Clyde, in Scotland, the native land of a share of the early settlers. A post office at Clyde was established in 1905, and remained in operation until 1965.

References

Scottish-American culture in North Dakota
Unincorporated communities in Cavalier County, North Dakota
Unincorporated communities in North Dakota